Maddie Baillio (born February 15, 1996) is an American actress and singer who appeared in the television special Hairspray Live and the film Dumplin'. She is a graduate of Marymount Manhattan College.

Filmography

References

External links
 

1996 births
Living people
21st-century American actresses
American film actresses
Marymount Manhattan College alumni
People from League City, Texas